A Robinson Crusoe economy is a simple framework used to study some fundamental issues in economics. It assumes an economy with one consumer, one producer and two goods. The title "Robinson Crusoe" is a reference to the 1719 novel of the same name authored by Daniel Defoe.

As a thought experiment in economics, many international trade economists have found this simplified and idealized version of the story important due to its ability to simplify the complexities of the real world. The implicit assumption is that the study of a one agent economy will provide useful insights into the functioning of a real world economy with many economic agents. This article pertains to the study of consumer behaviour, producer behaviour and equilibrium as a part of microeconomics. In other fields of economics, the Robinson Crusoe economy framework is used for essentially the same thing. For example, in public finance the Robinson Crusoe economy is used to study the various types of public goods and certain aspects of collective benefits. It is used in growth economics to develop growth models for underdeveloped or developing countries to embark upon a steady growth path using techniques of savings and investment.

Framework

Robinson Crusoe is assumed to be shipwrecked on a deserted island. 

The basic assumptions are as follows: 
 The island is cut off from the rest of the world (and hence cannot trade)
 There is only a single economic agent (Crusoe himself)
 All commodities on the island have to be produced or found from existing stocks

There is only one individual – Robinson Crusoe himself. He acts both as a producer to maximise profits, as well as consumer to maximise his utility. The possibility of trade can be introduced by adding another person to the economy. This person is Crusoe's friend, Man Friday. Although in the novel he plays the role of Crusoe's servant, in the Robinson Crusoe economy he is considered as another actor with equal decision making abilities as Crusoe. Along with this, conditions of Pareto efficiency can be analysed by bringing in the concept of the Edgeworth box.

Similar to the choices that households (suppliers of labour) face, Crusoe has only two activities to participate in – earn income or pass his time in leisure.

The income generating activity in this case is gathering coconuts. As usual, the more time he spends in leisure, the less food he has to eat, and conversely, the more time he spends gathering coconuts, the less time he has for leisure. This is depicted in figure 1.

Production function and indifference curves
Crusoe's indifference curves depict his preferences for leisure and coconuts while the production function depicts the technological relationship between how much he works and how many coconuts he gathers. If the axes depicting coconut collection and leisure are reversed and plotted with Crusoe's indifference map and production function, figure 2 can be drawn:

The production function is concave in two dimensions and quasi-convex in three dimensions. This means that the longer Robinson works, the more coconuts he will be able to gather. But due to diminishing marginal returns of labour, the additional number of coconuts he gets from every additional hour of labour is declining.

The point at which Crusoe will reach an equilibrium between the number of hours he works and relaxes can be found out when the highest indifference curve is tangent to the production function. This will be Crusoe's most preferred point provided the technology constraint is given and cannot be changed. At this equilibrium point, the slope of the highest indifference curve must equal the slope of the production function.

Recall that the marginal rate of substitution is the rate at which a consumer is ready to give up one good in exchange for another good while maintaining the same level of utility. Additionally, an input's marginal product  is the extra output that can be produced by using one more unit of the input, assuming that the quantities of no other inputs to production change. Then,

 MPL = MRSLeisure, Coconuts

where

 MPL = marginal product of labour, and

 MRSLeisure, Coconuts = marginal rate of substitution between leisure and coconuts

Crusoe's multifaceted role
Suppose Crusoe decides to stop being a producer and consumer simultaneously. He decides he will produce one day and consume the next. His two roles of consumer and producer are being split up and studied separately to understand the elementary form of consumer theory and producer theory in microeconomics. For dividing his time between being a consumer and producer, he must set up two collectively exhaustive markets, the coconut market and the labour market. He also sets up a firm, of which he becomes the sole shareholder. The firm will want to maximise profits by deciding how much labour to hire and how many coconuts to produce according to their prices. As a worker of the firm, Crusoe will collect wages, as a shareholder, he will collect profits and as a consumer, he will decide how much of the firm's output to purchase according to his income and the prevailing market prices. Let's assume that a currency called "Dollars" has been created by Robinson to manage his finances. For simplicity, assume that PriceCoconuts = $1.00. This assumption is made to make the calculations in the numerical example easy because the inclusion of prices will not alter the result of the analysis. For more details, refer to numéraire commodities.

Producer

Assume that when the firm produces C amount of total coconuts,  represents its profit level. Also assume that when the wage rate at which the firm employs labour is w, L is the amount of labour that will be employed. Then,

 

 

The above function describes iso-profit lines (the locus of combinations between labour and coconuts that produce a constant profit of Π). Profits can be maximised when the marginal product of labour equals the wage rate (marginal cost of production). Symbolically,

 MPL = w

Graphically, the iso-profit line must be tangent to the production function.

The vertical intercept of the iso-profit line measures the level of profit that Robinson Crusoe's firm will make. This level of profit, Π, has the ability to purchase Π dollars worth of coconuts. Since PriceCoconuts is $1.00, Π number of coconuts can be purchased. Also, the firm will declare a dividend of Π dollars. This will be given to the firm's sole shareholder, Crusoe himself.

Consumer

As a consumer, Crusoe will have to decide how much to work (or indulge in leisure) and hence consume. He can choose to not work at all, since he has an endowment of Π dollars from being a shareholder.  Let us instead consider the more realistic case of him deciding to work for a few hours. His labour consumption choice can be illustrated in figure 4:

Note that labour is assumed to be a 'bad', i.e., a commodity that a consumer doesn't like. Its presence in his consumption basket lowers the utility he derives. On the other hand, coconuts are goods. This is why the indifference curves are positively sloped. The maximum amount of labour is indicated by L'. The distance from L' to the chosen supply of labour (L*) gives Crusoe's demand for leisure.

Notice Crusoe's budget line. It has a slope of w and passes through the point (0,Π). This point is his endowment level i.e., even when he supplies 0 amount of labour, he has Π amount of coconuts (dollars) to consume. Given the wage rate, Crusoe will choose how much to work and how much to consume at that point where,

 MRSLeisure, Coconuts = w

Equilibrium

At equilibrium, the demand for coconuts will equal the supply of coconuts and the demand for labour will equal the supply of labour.

Graphically this occurs when the diagrams under consumer and producer are superimposed. Notice that,

 MRSLeisure, Coconuts = w

 MPL = w

 => MRSLeisure, Coconuts = MPL

This ensures that the slopes of the indifference curves and the production set are the same.

As a result, Crusoe ends up consuming at the same point he would have if he made all the above decisions together. In other words, using the market system has the same outcome as choosing the individual utility maximisation and cost minimisation plans. This is an important result when put into a macro level perspective because it implies that there exists a set of prices for inputs and outputs in the economy such that the profit-maximising behaviour of firms along with the utility-maximizing actions of individuals results in the demand for each good equaling the supply in all markets. This means that a
competitive equilibrium can exist. The merit of a competitive equilibrium is that an efficient allocation of resources is achievable. In other words, no economic agent can be made better off without making another economic agent worse off.

Production possibilities with two goods

Let's assume that there is another commodity that Crusoe can produce apart from coconuts, for example, fish. Now, Robinson has to decide how much time to spare for both activities, i.e. how many coconuts to gather and how many fish to hunt. The locus of the various combinations of fish and coconuts that he can produce from devoting different amounts of time to each activity is known as the production possibilities set. This is depicted in the figure 6:

The boundary of the production possibilities set is known as the production-possibility frontier (PPF). This curve measures the feasible outputs that Crusoe can produce, with a fixed technological constraint and given amount of resources. In this case, the resources and technological constraints are Robinson Crusoe's labour.

It is crucial to note that the shape of the PPF depends on the nature of the technology in use. Here, technology refers to the type of returns to scale prevalent. In figure 6, the underlying assumption is the usual decreasing returns to scale, due to which the PPF is concave to the origin. In case we assumed increasing returns to scale, say if Crusoe embarked upon a mass production movement and hence faced decreasing costs, the PPF would be convex to the origin. The PPF is linear with a downward slope in two circumstances:
 If the technology for gathering coconuts and hunting fish exhibits constant returns to scale
 If there is only one input in production

So in the Robinson Crusoe economy, the PPF will be linear due to the presence of only one input.

Marginal rate of transformation

Suppose that Crusoe can produce 4 pounds of fish or 8 pounds of coconuts per hour. If he devotes Lf hours to fish gathering and Lc hours to gathering coconuts, he will produce 4Lf pounds of fish and 8Lc pounds of coconuts. Suppose that he decides to work for 12 hours a day. Then the production possibilities set will consist of all combinations of fish, F, and coconuts, C, such that

 

 

 

Solve the first two equations and substitute in the third to get

 

This equation represents Crusoe's PPF. The slope of this PPF measures the Marginal rate of transformation (MRT), i.e., how much of the first good must be given up in order to increase the production of the second good by one unit. If Crusoe works one hour less on hunting fish, he will have 4 less fish. If he devotes this extra hour to collecting coconuts, he will have 8 extra coconuts. The MRT is thus,

 MRT Coconuts, Fish

Comparative advantage

Under this section, the possibility of trade is introduced by adding another person to the economy. Suppose that the new worker who is added to the Robinson Crusoe economy has different skills in gathering coconuts and hunting fish. The second person is called "Friday".

Friday can produce 8 pounds of fish or 4 pounds of coconuts per hour. If he too decides to work for 12 hours, his production possibilities set will be determined by the following relations:

 

Thus, MRT Coconuts, Fish 
 

This means that for every pound of coconuts Friday gives up, he can produce 2 more pounds of fish.

So, we can say that Friday has a comparative advantage  in hunting fish while Crusoe has a comparative advantage in gathering coconuts. Their respective PPFs can be shown in the following diagram:

The joint production possibilities set at the extreme right shows the total amount of both commodities that can be produced by Crusoe and Friday together. It combines the best of both workers. If both of them work to gather coconuts only, the economy will have 144 coconuts in all, 96 from Crusoe and 48 from Friday. (This can be obtained by setting F = 0 in their respective PPF equations and summing them up). Here the slope of the joint PPF is −1/2.

If we want more fish, we should shift that person who has a comparative advantage in fish hunting (i.e. Friday) out of coconut gathering and into fish hunting. When Friday is producing 96 pounds of fish, he is fully occupied. If fish production is to be increased beyond this point, Crusoe will have to start hunting fish. Here onward, the slope of the joint PPF is −2. If we want to produce only fish, then the economy will have 144 pounds of fish, 48 from Crusoe and 96 from Friday. Thus the joint PPF is kinked because Crusoe and Friday have comparative advantages in different commodities. As the economy gets more and more ways of producing output and different comparative advantages, the PPF becomes concave.

Pareto efficiency

Assume that there are c units of coconut and f units of fish available for consumption in the Crusoe Friday economy. Given this endowment bundle (c,f), the Pareto efficient bundle can be determined at the mutual tangency of Crusoe's and Friday's indifference curves in the Edgeworth box along the Pareto Set (contract curve). These are the bundles at which Crusoe's and Friday's marginal rate of substitution are equal.
In a simple exchange economy, the contract curve describes the set of bundles that exhaust the gains from trade. But in a Robinson Crusoe/Friday economy, there is another way to exchange goods – to produce less of one good and more of the other.

From the figure 8, it is clear that an economy operating at a position where the MRS of either Crusoe or Friday is not equal to the MRT between coconuts and fish cannot be Pareto efficient. This is because the rate at which, say Friday is willing to trade coconuts for fish is different from the rate at which coconuts can be transformed into fish. Thus, there is a way to make Friday better off by rearranging the production pattern.

Thus for Pareto efficiency,

 MRT Coconuts, Fish = MRSCoconuts, Fish 

(for both Crusoe and Friday)

This can be achieved in a competitive market by decentralising production and consumption decisions, i.e. Crusoe and Friday will both solve their own problems of how much to consume and produce independently.

See also
Autarky
Fundamental theorems of welfare economics
Robinson Crusoe § Economic — Economic interpretation of Robinson Crusoe
Welfare economics § Efficiency — Efficiency between production and consumption

References

External links
University courses
Jeffrey Miron's course at Harvard
Daniel McFadden's course at Harvard
Yossi Spiegel's course at Tel Aviv University
Thomas M. Steger's course at Center of Economic Research
Joseph Tao-yi Wang's course at Walden University
Larry Blume's course at Santa Fe Institute 
Teng Wah Leo's course at St.Francis Xavier University

Articles
 Stimulus works on absorbability
 The unfortunate uselessness of most 'state of the art' academic monetary economics

Economic growth
Microeconomics
Self-sustainability
Economics catchphrases
Production economics
Robinson Crusoe
Consumer theory
Thought experiments
Eponymous economic ideologies